Corinne Lisette Hofman FBA (born 10 July 1959) is a Dutch professor of Caribbean Archaeology at Leiden University since 2007. She was a winner of the 2014 Spinoza Prize.

Hofman was born in Wassenaar. She obtained a PhD at Leiden University in 1993.

Awards and recognitions
In 2013 Hofman won the Merian Prize of the Royal Netherlands Academy of Arts and Sciences. The Merian Prize is awarded to excelling women scientists, inspiring others to pursue a career in science. In 2014 she was one of four winners of the Dutch Spinoza Prize and received a 2,5 million euro grant. Since 2015 Hofman has been a member of the Royal Netherlands Academy of Arts and Sciences. Hofman was elected a member of Academia Europaea in 2016. In 2018 she was elected a Corresponding Fellow of the British Academy.

References

External links
 Profile at Leiden University

1959 births
Living people
21st-century Dutch archaeologists
Corresponding Fellows of the British Academy
Leiden University alumni
Academic staff of Leiden University
Members of Academia Europaea
Members of the Royal Netherlands Academy of Arts and Sciences
People from Wassenaar
Pre-Columbian scholars
Spinoza Prize winners
Dutch women archaeologists